ADMAR, an initialism for the German titleAbgesetzte Darstellung von MADAP Radar data, was the predecessor product of CIMACT.

Definition 
The EUROCONTROL software product ADMAR did combine and merge several  civilian surveillance- and military sensor data sources with Flight plan data sources. After data correlation it was able to provide a Recognised Air Picture (RAP). It could be operated on COTS hardware or special IT.

History 
ADMAR was developed on the basis of ADKAR and GAME footing on the special Agreement of MOD Germany (  – A/13/D/HG/82, April 18, 1983) in cooperation with EUROCONTROL. It has been operational since 1983 and was used by the German Air Force exclusively. Since 2003 it became of interest for other European countries, NATO and security related authorities and organisations as well. ADMAR 2000 was the final software release.   

Remark:
MADAP – Maastricht Automatic Data Processing system
ADKAR – Abgesetzte Darstellung von KARLDAP Radar-Daten
KARLDAP – Karlsruhe Automatic Data Processing system
GAME – GEADGE / ADKAR Message Exchange
GEADGE – German Air Defence Ground Environment

Utilisation 
In Germany the utilisation of ADMAR was as follows:
 Stationary Control and Reporting Centre (CRC), TACCS
 Operation Centre National Air Defence (de: Nationales Lage- und Führungszentrum für Sicherheit im Luftraum - NLFZ SiLuRa) 
 General Air Force Office (de: Luftwaffenamt) 
 :de:Multinational Aircrew Electronic Warfare Tactics Facility Polygone / en:Polygone Co-ordination Centre (PCC) 
 Bundeswehr Air Traffic Service Office (de: Amt für Flugsicherung der Bundeswehr - AFSBw) 
 JG 71 and  JG 74

See also 
  CIMACT - European Civil-Military Air Traffic Management Co-ordination Tool

External links 
 The EUROCONTROL OneSky Portal

Air traffic control in Europe
Air traffic control systems
Control engineering
Information systems